Anniston may refer to:

 Anniston, Alabama
 Anniston, Missouri
 Anniston Munitions Center
 Anniston (Amtrak station)
 USS Anniston, a.k.a. USS Montgomery (C-9)

See also
 Aniston (disambiguation)